Illya Serhiyovych Tsurkan (born 17 April 2002) is a Ukrainian professional footballer who plays as a central midfielder for Ukrainian First League club Skoruk Tomakivka on loan from Inhulets Petrove.

References

External links
 
 

2002 births
Living people
Sportspeople from Dnipropetrovsk Oblast
Ukrainian footballers
Association football midfielders
FC Inhulets Petrove players
FC Skoruk Tomakivka players
Ukrainian First League players